Glenn Wesley Schlechty (March 31, 1912 – April 3, 1962) was an American professional basketball player. He played in the National Basketball League for the Dayton Metropolitans in four games during the 1937–38 season and averaged 1.8 points per game.

References

1912 births
1962 deaths
American men's basketball players
Basketball players from Ohio
Dayton Metropolitans players
Findlay Oilers men's basketball players
Forwards (basketball)